Linda de Boer (born 1954) is a retired Dutch swimmer who won the silver medal in the 800 m freestyle at the 1970 European Aquatics Championships. In June 1971 she set a European record of 18 minutes and 3 seconds in the 1500 m freestyle. Between 1969 and 1971 she won two national titles and set 14 national records in the 400 m, 800 m and 1500 m freestyle events.

Her daughter, Daniëlle uit den Boogaard (b. 1983), and possibly son, David uit den Boogaard (b. 1983), also became competitive swimmers and national champions.

References

1954 births
Living people
Dutch female freestyle swimmers
European Aquatics Championships medalists in swimming
Sportspeople from Hilversum
20th-century Dutch women
20th-century Dutch people